Martin Doktor (born 26 September 1981 in Ilava – died 8 September 2004 in Dubodiel) was a Slovak football midfielder, who played as a midfielder. He died of congestive heart failure during the night of 7 to 8 September 2004, as the official date of death is given 8 September 2004.

References

1981 births
2004 deaths
Slovak footballers
Association football midfielders
FK Dubnica players
Slovak Super Liga players
People from Ilava
Sportspeople from the Trenčín Region